Mirza Qoli-ye Bahram Beygi (also Romanized as Mīrzā Qolī-ye Bahrām Beygī; also known as Mīrzā Qolī) is a village in Pataveh Rural District, Pataveh District, Dana County, Kohgiluyeh and Boyer-Ahmad Province, Iran. At the 2006 census, its population was 168, in 30 families.

References 

Populated places in Dana County